Idikundu (Idi-kun-du), translates in Tamil to 'Thunder Well',  is a natural water well in Navaly, Jaffna District, Sri Lanka.  Legend says it was created by a lightning strike in the early 20th century; some speculate it might be an asteroid that struck. 

The depth of this water well is so deep and it is unknown; it is also an unpopular location as some locals use this well to commit suicide. In the same Jaffna District, there is another natural water well in the suburb of Nilavarai.

See also

Casuarina Beach 
Keerimalai
Kantharodai
Nallur (Jaffna)
Naguleswaram temple
Nallur Kandaswamy Kovil
Nainativu
Neduntheevu
Nilavarai
Operation Plumbbob: The first nuclear-propelled manmade object in space?, also called a "Thunder well"

References 

Bodies of water of Jaffna District
Populated places in Northern Province, Sri Lanka